John Webb McMurry (born May 19, 1954), known as Webb Wilder, is an American country, rock & roll singer, guitarist and actor.

Early life 

McMurry was born in Hattiesburg, Mississippi. He started playing guitar at the age of 12 and was playing in bands when he was 14.

His aunt was Lillian McMurry, the founder of Trumpet Records. She mentored him and gave advice as he started in the music industry.

Career 
With his groups like The Drapes, The Beatnecks, The Nashvegans, Wilder combines the straight-ahead rock & roll with surf guitar of the Ventures and twang of Duane Eddy, drawing on the feel of blues, R&B, country/rockabilly and film noir. His sound incorporated influence from Americana music as well as from the British Invasion.

Wilder said that his music was progressive country. He has been signed to major labels and worked with independent labels. He has also hosted a radio show for Sirius Radio.

Webb Wilder appeared as an actor in Peter Bogdanovich's 1993 feature film The Thing Called Love. As of 2020, he was an afternoon-shift disc jockey for radio station WMOT, which is based in Murfreesboro, Tennessee.

Discography

Albums

Charted singles

Filmography 
 Paradise Park (1991)
 Corn Flicks (1992) consisted of three short films, including:
Webb Wilder Private Eye
 Grand prize winner of the Texas Union National Student Film Competition
 Aired repeatedly on the A&E Network and the USA Network show Night Flight
Horror Hayride
 Won Silver Hugo Award at the Chicago International Film Festival
 Awarded three stars by the Chicago Tribune
 Presented at the New Orleans Film & Video and Dallas Video Festivals
Aunt Hallie
 The Thing Called Love (1993) Ned
 Pueblo Sin Suerte (2002) Reb
 Born to be Wilder (2005) Himself
 Scattergun (2007)
 Webb Wilder Amazing B-Picture Shorts  (2009)

See also 
 Outlaw country
 Progressive country

References

External links 

 
 The ORIGINAL Webb Wilder website
  WEBB-TV
 Webb Wilder Films
 
 [ Complete discography from AllMusic]
 Biography from the Houston Press
 The Webb Wilder Credo
 Hunter Goatley's Webb Wilder Archive
 Webb Wilder interview about Mississippi Moderne

1954 births
American rock musicians
Musicians from Hattiesburg, Mississippi
Living people
Blind Pig Records artists
American radio personalities